North Ridge is a hamlet in the town of Cambria in Niagara County, New York, United States.

The North Ridge United Methodist Church was listed on the National Register of Historic Places in 2002.

References

Hamlets in New York (state)
Hamlets in Niagara County, New York